In structural proof theory, the nested sequent calculus is a reformulation of the sequent calculus to allow deep inference.

References

Proof theory
Logical calculi